Marilyn vos Savant (born Marilyn Mach; August 11, 1946) is an American magazine columnist who has the highest recorded intelligence quotient (IQ) in the Guinness Book of Records, a competitive category the publication has since retired. Since 1986, she has written "Ask Marilyn", a Parade magazine Sunday column wherein she solves puzzles and answers questions on various subjects, and which popularized the Monty Hall problem in 1990.

Biography
Marilyn vos Savant was born Marilyn Mach on August 11, 1946, in St. Louis, Missouri, to parents Joseph Mach and Marina vos Savant. Savant says one should keep premarital surnames, with sons taking their fathers' and daughters their mothers'. The word savant, meaning someone of learning, appears twice in her family: her grandmother's name was Savant; her grandfather's, vos Savant. She is of Italian, Czechoslovak, German, and Austrian ancestry, being descended from the physicist and philosopher Ernst Mach.

As a teenager, Savant worked in her father's general store and wrote for local newspapers using pseudonyms. She married at 16 and divorced ten years later. Her second marriage ended when she was 35.

She went to Meramec Community College and studied philosophy at Washington University in St. Louis but quit two years later to help with a family investment business. Savant moved to New York City in the 1980s to pursue a career in writing. Before starting "Ask Marilyn", she wrote the Omni I.Q. Quiz Contest for Omni, which included intelligence quotient (IQ) quizzes and expositions on intelligence and its testing.

Savant married Robert Jarvik (one of the co-developers of the Jarvik-7 artificial heart) on August 23, 1987, and was made Chief Financial Officer of Jarvik Heart, Inc. She has served on the board of directors of the National Council on Economic Education, on the advisory boards of the National Association for Gifted Children and the National Women's History Museum, and as a fellow of the Committee for Skeptical Inquiry. Toastmasters International named her one of "Five Outstanding Speakers of 1999", and in 2003 she was awarded an honorary Doctor of Letters degree from The College of New Jersey.

Rise to fame and IQ score
Savant was listed in the Guinness Book of World Records under "Highest IQ" from 1985 to 1989 and entered the Guinness Book of World Records Hall of Fame in 1988. Guinness retired the "Highest IQ" category in 1990 after concluding IQ tests were too unreliable to designate a single record holder. The listing drew nationwide attention.

Guinness cited vos Savant's performance on two intelligence tests, the Stanford-Binet and the Mega Test. She took the 1937 Stanford-Binet, Second Revision test at age ten. She says her first test was in September 1956 and measured her mental age at 22 years and 10 months, yielding a 228 score. This figure was listed in the Guinness Book of World Records; it is also listed in her books' biographical sections and was given by her in interviews.

The second test reported by Guinness was Hoeflin's Mega Test, taken in the mid-1980s. The Mega Test yields IQ standard scores obtained by multiplying the subject's normalized z-score, or the rarity of the raw test score, by a constant standard deviation and adding the product to 100, with Savant's raw score reported by Hoeflin to be 46 out of a possible 48, with a 5.4 z-score, and a standard deviation of 16, arriving at a 186 IQ.  The Mega Test has been criticized by professional psychologists as improperly designed and scored, "nothing short of number pulverization".

Savant sees IQ tests as measurements of a variety of mental abilities and thinks intelligence entails so many factors that "attempts to measure it are useless". 
She has held memberships with the high-IQ societies Mensa International and the Mega Society.

"Ask Marilyn"
Following her listing in the 1986 Guinness Book of World Records, Parade ran a profile of her along with a selection of questions from Parade readers and her answers. Parade continued to get questions, so "Ask Marilyn" was made.

She uses her column to answer questions on many chiefly academic subjects; solve logical, mathematical or vocabulary puzzles posed by readers; answer requests for advice with logic; and give self-devised quizzes and puzzles. Aside from the weekly printed column, "Ask Marilyn" is a daily online column that adds to the printed version by resolving controversial answers, correcting mistakes, expanding answers, reposting previous answers, and solving additional questions.

Three of her books (Ask Marilyn, More Marilyn, and Of Course, I'm for Monogamy) are compilations of questions and answers from "Ask Marilyn". The Power of Logical Thinking includes many questions and answers from the column.

Famous columns

Monty Hall problem

Savant was asked the following question in her September 9, 1990, column:

This question is called the Monty Hall problem due to its resembling scenarios on the game show Let's Make a Deal; its answer existed before it was used in "Ask Marilyn". She said the selection should be switched to door #2 because it has a  probability of success, while door #1 has just . To summarize,  of the time the opened door #3 will indicate the location of the door with the car (the door you had not picked and the one not opened by the host). Only  of the time will the opened door #3 mislead you into changing from the winning door to a losing door. These probabilities assume you change your choice each time door #3 is opened, and that the host always opens a door with a goat. This response provoked letters from thousands of readers, nearly all arguing doors #1 and #2 each have an equal chance of success. A follow-up column reaffirming her position served only to intensify the debate and soon became a feature article on the front page of The New York Times. Parade received around 10,000 letters from readers who thought that her workings were incorrect.

Under the "standard" version of the problem, the host always opens a losing door and offers a switch. In the standard version, Savant's answer is correct. However, the statement of the problem as posed in her column is ambiguous. The answer depends on what strategy the host is following. If  the host operates under a strategy of offering a switch only if the initial guess is correct, it would clearly be disadvantageous to accept the offer. If the host merely selects a door at random, the question is likewise very different from the standard version. Savant addressed these issues by writing the following in Parade magazine, "the original answer defines certain conditions, the most significant of which is that the host always opens a losing door on purpose. Anything else is a different question."

She expounded on her reasoning in a second follow-up and called on school teachers to show the problem to classes. In her final column on the problem, she gave the results of more than 1,000 school experiments. Most respondents now agree with her original solution, with half of the published letters declaring their authors had changed their minds.

"Two boys" problem

Like the Monty Hall problem, the "two boys" or "second-sibling" problem predates Ask Marilyn, but generated controversy in the column, first appearing there in 1991–1992 in the context of baby beagles:

When Savant replied "one out of three", readers wrote the odds were 50–50. In a follow-up, she defended her answer, saying, "If we could shake a pair of puppies out of a cup the way we do dice, there are four ways they could land", in three of which at least one is male, but in only one of which none are male.

The confusion arises here because the bather is not asked if the puppy he is holding is a male, but rather if either is a male. If the puppies are labeled (A and B), each has a 50% chance of being male independently. This independence is restricted when at least A or B is male. Now, if A is not male, B must be male, and if B is not male, A must be male. This restriction is introduced by the way the question is structured and is easily overlookedmisleading people to the erroneous answer of 50%. See Boy or Girl paradox for solution details.

The problem re-emerged in 1996–97 with two cases juxtaposed:

Savant agreed with the teacher, saying the chances were only 1 out of 3 that the woman had two boys, but 1 out of 2 the man had two boys. Readers argued for 1 out of 2 in both cases, prompting follow-ups. Finally she began a survey, asking female readers with exactly two children, at least one of them male, to give the sex of both children. Of the 17,946 women who responded, 35.9%, about 1 in 3, had two boys.

Errors in the column

On January 22, 2012, Savant admitted a mistake in her column. In the original column, published on December 25, 2011, a reader asked:

Her response was:

The correctness of the answer depends on how the question is asked. Each time the random-number generator runs, the employee's chance of being selected is 25%, but the probability of being chosen at least once across the 4 events is higher. In this case, the correct answer is around 68%, calculated as the complement of the probability of not being chosen in any of the four quarters: 1 – (0.754).

On June 22, 2014, Savant made an error in a word problem. The question was: "If two people could complete a project in six hours, how long would it take each of them to do identical projects on their own, given that one took four hours longer than the other?" Her answer was 10 hours and 14 hours, reasoning that if together it took them 6 hours to complete a project, then the total effort was 12 "man hours". If they then each do a separate full project, the total effort needed would be 24 hours, so the answer (10+14) needed to add up to 24 with a difference of 4. Savant later issued a correction, as the answer ignored the fact that the two people get different amounts of work done per hour: if they are working jointly on a project, they can maximize their combined productivity, but if they split the work in half, one person will finish sooner and cannot fully contribute. This subtlety causes the problem to require solving a quadratic equation and does not have a rational solution.

Fermat's Last Theorem
A few months after Andrew Wiles said he had proved Fermat's Last Theorem, Savant published the book The World's Most Famous Math Problem (October 1993), which surveys the history of Fermat's Last Theorem as well as other mathematical problems. Reviewers questioned her criticism of Wiles' proof; asking whether it was based on a correct understanding of mathematical induction, proof by contradiction, and imaginary numbers.

Especially contested was Savant's statement that Wiles' proof should be rejected for its use of non-Euclidean geometry. Savant stated that because "the chain of proof is based in hyperbolic (Lobachevskian) geometry", and because squaring the circle is seen as a "famous impossibility" despite being possible in hyperbolic geometry, then "if we reject a hyperbolic method of squaring the circle, we should also reject a hyperbolic proof of Fermat's last theorem."

Specialists flagged discrepancies between the two cases, distinguishing the use of hyperbolic geometry as a tool for proving Fermat's Last Theorem from its use as a setting for squaring the circle: squaring the circle in hyperbolic geometry is a different problem from that of squaring it in Euclidean geometry, whereas Fermat's Last Theorem is not inherently geometry-specific. Savant was criticized for rejecting hyperbolic geometry as a satisfactory basis for Wiles' proof, with critics pointing out that axiomatic set theory (rather than Euclidean geometry) is now the accepted foundation of mathematical proofs and that set theory is sufficiently robust to encompass both Euclidean and non-Euclidean geometry as well as geometry and adding numbers.

Savant retracted the argument in a July 1995 addendum, saying she saw the theorem as "an intellectual challenge'to find another proof using only tools available to Fermat in the 17th century.

The book came with a glowing introduction by Martin Gardner, which had been based on an earlier draft of the book that did not contain any of the contentious views.

Publications
 1985 – Omni I.Q. Quiz Contest
 1990 – Brain Building: Exercising Yourself Smarter (co-written with Leonore Fleischer)
 1992 – Ask Marilyn: Answers to America's Most Frequently Asked Questions
 1993 – The World's Most Famous Math Problem: The Proof of Fermat's Last Theorem and Other Mathematical Mysteries
 1994 – More Marilyn: Some Like It Bright!
 1994 – "I've Forgotten Everything I Learned in School!": A Refresher Course to Help You Reclaim Your Education
 1996 – Of Course I'm for Monogamy: I'm Also for Everlasting Peace and an End to Taxes
 1996 – The Power of Logical Thinking: Easy Lessons in the Art of Reasoning...and Hard Facts about Its Absence in Our Lives
 2000 – The Art of Spelling: The Madness and the Method
 2002 – Growing Up: A Classic American Childhood

References

External links

 
 
 

1946 births
American columnists
American women dramatists and playwrights
American self-help writers
American people of German descent
American people of Italian descent
Living people
Writers from St. Louis
Washington University in St. Louis alumni
Mensans
American people of Czech descent
American people of Austrian descent
American women non-fiction writers
American women columnists
Guinness World Records